Michael Bergmann is an American writer, director, and producer.

Biography
Michael Bergmann graduated with a B.A. in Latin from Columbia University in 1975 and studied film concurrently at N.Y.U. Undergraduate Film School. He went on to study at the N.Y.U. Graduate School of Film and Television. He is married to the sculptor Meredith Bergmann.

Works
In 1995, he made his first commercially released feature, Milk & Money, on 35 mm film produced by RKO Pictures, but as early as 1976 he began making narrative films on video from his own scripts. Bergmann's films are "sexy, surreal and entirely original," (Sam Maser, Program director of the Hamptons International Film festival, 1995) and "unafraid to be both smart and silly," (Lisa Nesselson, writing in Variety, 2002).

Milk & Money features performances by Calista Flockhart, Margaret Colin, Marin Hinkle, Olympia Dukakis and Dina Merrill in varied and engaging roles for women. Such roles characterize Bergmann's writing and directing. His prize-winning short in Bed with My Books, which explores the interior lives of older women, was an audience favorite at the Montréal festival. The cast of Milk and Money also includes Robert Vaughn and Peter Boyle.

Tied to a Chair features performances by Bonnie Loren and Mario Van Peebles. Best Feature Film, Feature Audience Award, Best Actress for Bonnie Loren – The New York International Independent Film and Video Festival.

Bergmann wrote the libretto for Stefania de Kenessey’s opera based on Tom Wolfe’s novel The Bonfire of the Vanities and directed the premiere in New York on October 9, 2015.

Style
Bergmann has been inspired by the innovative dialogue of Harold Pinter and David Mamet, but says he does not share their concerns. "To be as angry as Pinter you have to be able to see something from a single point of view. The minute you are interested in seeing things from different points of view you lose a lot of forward motion." Bergmann prefers to explore themes and variations which he skillfully interweaves into coherent, emotionally satisfying narratives. He says he loves the Arabian Nights for the ways in which "the emotions are so real they anchor the flying carpets." His films offer preposterous connections, fictional institutions and unresearched statistics that are completely convincing. His flair for the absurd does not, however, carry him into Surrealism.  He finds that "the irrational is only interesting if you can understand it."

Bergmann directs the transitions between his actors' lines, rather than the lines themselves, so that audiences get to know the characters by watching them think. He seeks to inspire performances that combine the emotional honesty of the Method with the technical precision of British acting. "Helping someone understand the full range of meanings in a text liberates the actor to create a performance that's uniquely his own and truly fresh," Bergmann explains. He has worked with exceptional new talents, such as Calista Flockhart, Marin Hinkle and Bridget Moynahan, before they became well known, though some of his greatest pleasures have come from directing established performers he has long admired, but in very unusual roles, including Peter Boyle, Olympia Dukakis, Tovah Feldshuh, and Robert Vaughn who captured Bergmann's imagination as the Man from U.N.C.L.E. when Bergmann was a child and for whom Bergmann created the role of a mysterious uncle in Milk & Money.

Bergmann has used digital photography since its inception, finding ways to work both with and against the limited contrast ratio of the digital medium. Bergmann prides himself on being able to obtain exceptional image quality and subtly expressive lighting on relatively low-budget equipment. The resulting images have some of the vividness of 13th Century stained glass, a major influence on both Bergmann's photographic style and his sense of narrative since he first visited [Chartres Cathedral] as a teenager.

In 1999, Bergmann wrote one of the first how-to books on digital filmmaking, Trifling With Fate: How to Make a Digital Video Feature Film. He has also appeared as a lecturer and panelist at independent film conferences, speaking on the latest trends in state-of-the-art technology. He believes that the use of the latest digital technology enhances cinematic creativity by enabling filmmakers “to do much more on budgets which restrict them much less” every year or so.

He has also directed many plays and worked with musicians, dancers and artists in other genres, including his wife, the sculptor and writer Meredith Bergmann, who has been the production designer on many of his film and theater projects. In 2008 he co-wrote What Silent Love Hath Writ: A Psychoanalytic Exploration of Shakespeare's Sonnets with his father, Martin Bergmann.

Background
Bergmann is the son of two Freudian psychoanalysts and the grandson of Hugo Bergmann, a philosopher who was one of the founders of Hebrew University in Jerusalem. He is also the great-grandson of Berta Fanta, a Prague salonière whose circle included Franz Kafka and Max Brod. This cosmopolitan background has enabled him to create original films that weave together French New Wave character studies, the ironic humor of 1960s Czech cinema and re-examinations of classic Hollywood genres.

Filmography 
Bergmann's films include:
 Milk & Money (1996)
 Best American Independent Feature, Cleveland International Film Festival
 Prix SACD, Avignon Film Festival
 Trifling With Fate (2000) with Bridget Moynahan, Gordon Elliott, Vivienne Benesch, Jason Butler Harner, Teri Lamm and Sarah Winkler
 In Bed with My Books (2002) (Short) – Prix du Jury, Montreal World Film Festival
 Aftershock (2002) – Best Short Film, Whitehead International Film Festival
 The Reality Trap (2005) with Bonnie Loren, Kevin Stapleton and Hedy Burress
 Tied to a Chair (2009) with Bonnie Loren, Mario Van Peebles and Robert Gosset
 Influence (2015) 
 Platinum Remi Award, Docu-Drama, WorldFest-Houston International Film Festival
 Best Supporting Actress, Rachel Zeiger-Haag, WorldFest-Houston International Film Festival

References

External links
 
 
 “Tied to a Chair”: Bound for Glory - The New Yorker
 Milk and Money - The New York Times
http://www.ft.com/cms/s/0/711a615a-718d-11e5-9b9e-690fdae72044.html - Bonfire of the Vanities, the Opera - The Financial Times

American film directors
American people of Czech-Jewish descent
Jewish American writers
Living people
Year of birth missing (living people)
21st-century American Jews